Simonetta "Simona" Izzo (born 22 April 1953) is an Italian actress, voice actress, director and screenwriter.

Biography
Born in Rome, the daughter of the voice actor Renato Izzo, at a young age Simona Izzo started working as a dubber. In 1990 she won the Nastro d'Argento for best dubber for the dubbing of Jacqueline Bisset in the Italian version of Scenes from the Class Struggle in Beverly Hills.  After having appeared as an actress in a number of series and films and having collaborated to a number of screenplays written by her husband Ricky Tognazzi, her debut film Sentimental Maniacs got her the David di Donatello for Best New Director.

Personal life
From her marriage to singer-songwriter Antonello Venditti, she has a son, Francesco. Since 1995, she has been married to director Ricky Tognazzi. She's an atheist.

Selected Television 

Co-hosted for RAI, and ultimately, Eurovision, the 1982 Italian Heat of Jeux Sans Frontieres on Tuesday 25 May at The Harbour, La Maddalena (Maddalena), Italy.

Selected filmography 
 Screenwriter

  Little Misunderstandings (1989) 
  Ultra (1991) 
  The Escort (1993) 
  Strangled Lives (1996)  
  Canone inverso (2000)  
  The Good Pope: Pope John XXIII (2003)

 Screenwriter and director
  Sentimental Maniacs (1994) 
  Bedrooms (1997)

References

External links 
 
 

1953 births
Living people
Actresses from Rome
Film people from Rome
Italian women film directors
Italian women screenwriters
David di Donatello winners
Nastro d'Argento winners
Italian atheists
Italian film actresses
Italian television actresses
Italian voice actresses
20th-century Italian actresses
21st-century Italian actresses
20th-century Italian screenwriters
21st-century Italian screenwriters
Italian twins
People of Campanian descent